Buddhism can be practiced in Cuba. Traditionally, most religious people in Cuba practice Christianity or other Indigenous religions. Some Buddhist figures have traveled to the country in the past, no big problems have arisen to this point. Originally brought by the Chinese immigrants, it is now practiced in communities monitored overseas. The number of practitioners is small.

References 

Buddhism by country
Religion in Cuba